The Portugal Open in badminton is an international open held annually in Portugal since 1965. It is currently a part of the European Badminton Circuit.

Previous winners

Performances by nation

References

External links
InternationalBadminton.org: 2006 results

Badminton tournaments
Badminton tournaments in Portugal
Sports competitions in Portugal
Recurring sporting events established in 1965